Rohit Dhawan (born 26 December 1983) is an Indian filmmaker. He is the son of filmmaker David Dhawan, and the brother of Varun Dhawan.

Personal life
Rohit Dhawan was born to director David Dhawan and Karuna Chopra on 26 December 1983 in Mumbai, Maharashtra. He is the elder brother of actor, Varun Dhawan, and nephew of Anil Dhawan and late, Ashok Dhawan. His paternal cousin, Siddharth Dhawan, is Anil Dhawan's son. His maternal cousin is director Kunal Kohli. He has a filmmaking degree from New York University. 

Rohit Dhawan married entrepreneur Jaanvi Desai on 10 February 2012 in Goa, after dating for 7 years. They have two children, daughter Niyara (born on 30 May 2018) and a son Abheer (born on 4 May 2022).

Filmography

References

External links 
 

Living people
Indian male screenwriters
Hindi-language film directors
21st-century Indian film directors
1986 births
Film directors from Mumbai